Jordan Alan Moore-Taylor (born 24 January 1994) is an English professional footballer who plays as a defender for League One club Forest Green Rovers.

Career

Exeter City
Born in Exeter, Moore-Taylor started his footballing career at Stoke Hill AFC before signing his first professional contract with Exeter City in summer 2012 after progressing through the club's youth academy.

Moore-Taylor made his professional debut for Exeter on 14 August 2012 in a 2–1 defeat to Crystal Palace at St James Park in the League Cup. He scored his first professional goal against Cheltenham Town in a 1–1 draw.

Milton Keynes Dons
On 19 June 2018, Moore-Taylor followed former Exeter manager Paul Tisdale to Milton Keynes Dons after six years at Exeter, signing a two-year deal after he activated a clause in his contract to leave Exeter. He scored his first goal for the club on 12 January 2019 during a 4–3 away defeat to Bury. A knee injury suffered two weeks later in a 1–0 away defeat to Grimsby Town resulted in him being sidelined for the remainder of the campaign. Following the conclusion of the 2019–20 season, Moore-Taylor was one of nine players released by the club.

Forest Green Rovers
On 21 July 2020, Moore-Taylor joined League Two club Forest Green Rovers on a two-year deal.

Career statistics

Honours
Milton Keynes Dons
League Two third-place promotion: 2018–19

Forest Green Rovers
League Two: 2021–22

References

External links
Jordan Moore-Taylor player profile at Exeter City website

1994 births
Living people
Sportspeople from Exeter
Footballers from Devon
English footballers
Association football defenders
English Football League players
Exeter City F.C. players
Milton Keynes Dons F.C. players
Forest Green Rovers F.C. players